Mesotrosta is a genus of moths of the family Noctuidae.

Species
 Mesotrosta incerta Staudinger, 1892
 Mesotrosta ingobilis Boursin, 1954
 Mesotrosta signalis (Treitschke, 1829)

References
Natural History Museum Lepidoptera genus database
Mesotrosta at funet

Hadeninae